The Treaty of Lausanne is a peace treaty negotiated during the Lausanne Conference of 1922–23 and signed in the Palais de Rumine, Lausanne, Switzerland, on 24 July 1923. The treaty officially settled the conflict that had originally existed between the Ottoman Empire and the Allied French Republic, British Empire, Kingdom of Italy, Empire of Japan, Kingdom of Greece, Kingdom of Serbia, and the Kingdom of Romania since the onset of World War I. The original text of the treaty is in French. It was the result of a second attempt at peace after the failed and unratified Treaty of Sèvres, which aimed to divide Ottoman territories. The earlier treaty had been signed in 1920, but later rejected by the Turkish National Movement who fought against its terms. As a result of the Greco-Turkish War, Izmir was retrieved and the Armistice of Mudanya was signed in October 1922. It provided for the Greek-Turkish population exchange and allowed unrestricted civilian, non-military, passage through the Turkish Straits.

The treaty was ratified by Turkey on 23 August 1923, and all of the other signatories by 16 July 1924. It came into force on 6 August 1924, when the instruments of ratification were officially deposited in Paris.

A Declaration of Amnesty granted immunity for crimes committed between 1914 and 1922, notably the Armenian genocide. Historian Hans-Lukas Kieser states, "Lausanne tacitly endorsed comprehensive policies of expulsion and extermination of hetero-ethnic and hetero-religious groups".

Background

After the withdrawal of the Greek forces in Asia Minor and the expulsion of the Ottoman Sultan by the Turkish army under the command of Mustafa Kemal Atatürk, the Ankara-based Kemalist government of the Turkish National Movement rejected the territorial losses imposed by the 1920 Treaty of Sèvres previously signed by the Ottoman Empire but remained unratified. Britain had sought to undermine Turkish influence in Mesopotamia and Kirkuk by seeking the creation of a Kurdish state in Eastern Anatolia. Secular Kemalist rhetoric relieved some of the international concerns about the future of Armenians who had survived the 1915 Armenian genocide, and support for Kurdish self determination similarly declined. Under the Treaty of Lausanne, signed in 1923, Eastern Anatolia became part of modern-day Turkey, in exchange for Turkey's relinquishing Ottoman-era claims to the oil-rich Arab lands.

Negotiations were undertaken during the Conference of Lausanne. İsmet İnönü was the chief negotiator for Turkey. Lord Curzon, the British Foreign Secretary of that time, was the chief negotiator for the Allies, while Eleftherios Venizelos negotiated on behalf of Greece. The negotiations took many months. On 20 November 1922, the peace conference was opened; the treaty was signed on 24 July after eight months of arduous negotiation, punctuated by several Turkish withdrawals. The Allied delegation included U.S. Admiral Mark L. Bristol, who served as the United States High Commissioner and supported Turkish efforts.

Stipulations
The treaty was composed of 143 articles with major sections including:

The treaty provided for the independence of the Republic of Turkey but also for the protection of the Greek Orthodox Christian minority in Turkey and the Muslim minority in Greece. However, most of the Christian population of Turkey and the Muslim population of Greece had already been deported under the earlier Convention Concerning the Exchange of Greek and Turkish Populations signed by Greece and Turkey. Only the Greek Orthodox of Constantinople, Imbros and Tenedos (about 270,000 at that time), and the Muslim population of Western Thrace (about 129,120 in 1923) were excluded. Article 14 of the treaty granted the islands of Imbros (Gökçeada) and Tenedos (Bozcaada) "special administrative organisation", a right that was revoked by the Turkish government on 17 February 1926. Turkey also formally accepted the loss of Cyprus (which had been leased to the British Empire following the Congress of Berlin in 1878, but de jure remained an Ottoman territory until World War I). The fate of the province of Mosul was left to be determined through the League of Nations. Turkey also explicitly renounced all claims to the Dodecanese Islands, which Italy had been obliged to return to Turkey according to Article 2 of the Treaty of Ouchy in 1912 following the Italo-Turkish War (1911–1912).

Summary of Contents of Treaty

Borders

The treaty delimited the boundaries of Greece, Bulgaria, and Turkey. Specifically, the treaty provisioned that all the islands, islets and other territories in the Aegean Sea (Eastern Mediterranean in the original text) beyond three miles from the Turkish shores were ceded to Greece, with the exception of Imbros, Tenedos and Rabbit islands (Articles 6 and 12). There is a special notation in both articles, that, unless it is explicitly stated otherwise, the Turkish sovereignty extends three miles from Asia Minor shores. The Greek population of Imbros and Tenedos was not included in the population exchange and would be protected under the stipulations of the protection of the minorities in Turkey (Article 38).

The major issue of the war reparations, demanded from Greece by Turkey, was abandoned after Greece agreed to cede Karaağaç to Turkey.

Turkey also formally ceded all claims on the Dodecanese Islands (Article 15); Cyprus (Article 20); Egypt and Sudan (Article 17); Syria and Iraq (Article 3); and (along with the Treaty of Ankara) settled the boundaries of the latter two nations.

The territories to the south of Syria and Iraq on the Arabian Peninsula, which still remained under Turkish control when the Armistice of Mudros was signed on 30 October 1918, were not explicitly identified in the text of the treaty. However, the definition of Turkey's southern border in Article 3 also meant that Turkey officially ceded them. These territories included the Mutawakkilite Kingdom of Yemen, Asir and parts of Hejaz like the city of Medina. They were held by Turkish forces until 23 January 1919.

By Articles 25 and 26 of the Treaty of Lausanne, Turkey officially ceded Adakale Island in the Danube River to Romania by formally recognizing the related provisions in the Treaty of Trianon of 1920. Due to a diplomatic irregularity at the 1878 Congress of Berlin, the island had technically remained part of the Ottoman Empire.

Turkey also renounced its privileges in Libya which were defined by Article 10 of the Treaty of Ouchy in 1912 (per Article 22 of the Treaty of Lausanne in 1923.)

Agreements
Among many agreements, there was a separate agreement with the United States, the Chester concession.  In the United States, the treaty was opposed by several groups, including the Committee Opposed to the Lausanne Treaty (COLT), and on 18 January 1927, the United States Senate refused to ratify the treaty by a vote of 50–34, six votes short of the two-thirds required by the Constitution. Consequently, Turkey annulled the concession.

Besides, Turkey was obliged to instate four European advisors on juridical matters for five years. The advisors were to observe a juridical reform in Turkey. The advisors contract could be renewed if the suggested reforms would not have taken place. Subsequently, Turkey worked on and announced a new Turkish constitution and reformed the Turkish justice system by including the Swiss Civil code, the Italian criminal law and the German Commercial law before completion of the five years in question.

Declaration of Amnesty

Annex VIII to the treaty, called "Declaration of Amnesty", granted immunity to the perpetrators of any crimes "connected to political events" committed between 1914 and 1922. The treaty thus put an end to the effort to prosecute Ottoman war criminals for crimes such as the Armenian genocide, the Assyrian genocide, the Greek genocide, and codified impunity for these crimes.

Legacy

The Treaty of Lausanne led to the international recognition of the sovereignty of the new Republic of Turkey as the successor state of the Ottoman Empire. As result of the Treaty, the Ottoman public debt was divided between Turkey and the countries which emerged from the former Ottoman Empire. The convention on the Straits lasted for thirteen years and was replaced with the Montreux Convention Regarding the Regime of the Straits in 1936. The customs limitations in the treaty were shortly after reworked.

For Greece, the treaty brought to an end the impetus behind the Megali Idea, the notion that modern Greece should encompass those territories in Asia Minor which had been populated with Greek speakers for up to 3000 years and which also formed the core of the Eastern Roman Empire.

Hatay Province remained a part of the French Mandate of Syria according to the Treaty of Lausanne, but in 1938 gained its independence as the Hatay State, which later joined Turkey after a referendum in 1939. Political amnesty was given to opponents of the new Turkish regime but the government reserved the right to make 150 exceptions. The 150 personae non gratae of Turkey (mostly descendants of the Ottoman dynasty) slowly acquired citizenship – the last one in 1974.

Assessment

Lloyd George, who had supported Greece's expansionary designs, declared the treaty an "abject, cowardly and infamous surrender".

Historian Norman Naimark states, "The Lausanne Treaty served as a pivotal international precedent for transferring populations against their will throughout the twentieth century."

Historian Ronald Grigor Suny states that the treaty "essentially confirmed the effectiveness of deportations or even murderous ethnic cleansing as a potential solution to population problems".

Historian Hans-Lukas Kieser states, "Lausanne tacitly endorsed comprehensive policies of expulsion and extermination of hetero-ethnic and hetero-religious groups, with fatal attraction for German revisionists and many other nationalists".

Conspiracy theories

The Treaty of Lausanne has given rise to a number of conspiracy theories in Turkey. It has been claimed that the treaty was signed to be effective for a century and there are "secret articles" in the treaty regarding Turkey's mining of natural resources. One conspiracy theory that had following in the 2010s held that the treaty would expire in 2023 and Turkey would be allowed to mine boron and petroleum.

See also 

 Outline and timeline of the Greek genocide
 Aftermath of World War I
 Greek refugees
 Minority Treaties
 Muslim minority of Greece
 Population exchange between Greece and Turkey
 San Remo conference
 Treaty of Lausanne Monument and Museum in Karaağaç, Edirne, Turkey
 Turks of the Dodecanese
 Turks of Western Thrace
 Conspiracy theories in Turkey

Notes and references

External links

 Full text of the Treaty of Lausanne (1923)
 

Lausanne, Treaty of
Aftermath of World War I in Turkey
Forced migration
Eleftherios Venizelos
Treaties of Turkey
Treaty
World War I treaties
1923 in Switzerland
Treaties concluded in 1923
Treaties of the Kingdom of Greece
Treaties of the Turkish War of Independence
Romania–Turkey relations
Treaties of the United Kingdom
Treaties of the French Third Republic
Treaties of the Kingdom of Italy (1861–1946)
Treaties of the Empire of Japan
Treaties of the Kingdom of Romania
Treaties of the Kingdom of Yugoslavia
Treaties entered into force in 1924
League of Nations treaties
Peace treaties of Greece
Greco-Turkish War (1919–1922)
Greater Romania
July 1923 events
Impunity